The Maxus Mifa 9 is an electric minivan produced by SAIC Maxus, which launched on the Chinese car market in November 2021. The Mifa 9 is based on the same platform as the later announced gasoline powered Maxus G90 MPV.

Overview
The Mifa 9 was previewed by the Maxus Mifa concept presented at the Auto Shanghai in April 2021, showing the concept of a large, luxurious van with all-electric drive. The production model called Maxus Mifa 9 made its official debut in November 2021 at Auto Guangzhou, being the largest and most luxurious electric vehicle of the Maxus brand.

Visually, the Mifa 9 is distinguished by a massive, two-color painted silhouette with a regular body shape with full LED lighting. The rear lamps were decorated with three-arm lamps, dominating the body in both width and length. The luxuriously arranged passenger cabin has space for 6 separate seats with a full range of adjustments.

Production and sales of Mifa 9 began right after the November debut, in the mainland Chinese market. Moreover, Maxus also plan to start selling the vehicle on selected markets of Western Europe, including the United Kingdom.

Specifications
The Mifa 9 is a fully electric minivan powered by a  electric motor.

Markets
It was launched in Australia for the 2023 model year as the LDV Mifa 9, and it is priced from AU$106,000. Then in Thailand released in March 2023.

Maxus G90

The Maxus G90 is a minivan produced by SAIC Maxus, which launched on the Chinese car market in April 2022. The G90 is the gasoline-powered variant of the electric Maxus Mifa 9 MPV.

Overview

The interior features a 10-inch heads-up display and a full-width digital unit with three screens across the dashboard. The multimedia system runs on Maxus’ Spider Wisdom 2.0 system and the audio system being JBL’s flagship.

The G90 comes equipped with a 2.0-liter turbocharged petrol engine plus a 48V mild hybrid system with 230 hp mated to an Aisin 8-speed automatic gearbox.

References

Mifa 9
Minivans
Production electric cars
Euro NCAP large MPVs
Cars introduced in 2021
Front-wheel-drive vehicles